At the 1932 Winter Olympics, two bobsleigh events were contested. The competitions were held from February 9, 1932 to February 15, 1932. Events were held at the Lake Placid bobsleigh, luge, and skeleton track.

Medal summary

Participating nations

Eleven bobsledders competed in both events.

A total of 41 bobsledders from eight nations competed at the Lake Placid Games:

Medal table

References

External links
1932 bobsleigh two-man results
1932 bobsleigh four-man results

 
1932 Winter Olympics
1932 Winter Olympics events
Olympics
Bobsleigh in the United States